Ruth Johnson is an American politician who served as the Secretary of State of Michigan and is a current member of the Michigan Senate from Michigan's 24th Senate district (which was previously numbered the 14th district from 2019–2022). She is a former member of the Michigan House of Representatives and the 2006 Republican candidate for lieutenant governor as the running mate of Dick DeVos.

Background
Johnson, of Holly, was a former public school teacher, small business owner, and public official in a suburban area immediately north of Detroit with a population of more than one million, prior to her election as secretary of state in November 2010.  She was elected to the Oakland County Board of Commissioners in 1988 and served for 10 years.  Johnson was elected to the Michigan House of Representatives in 1998, and re-elected in 2000 and 2002; term limits meant she was ineligible for a fourth term. She was elected Oakland County Clerk and Register of Deeds in 2004, upsetting incumbent G. William Caddell in the Republican Primary and defeated Democratic nominee Jason Ellenburg in the general election. She became the first woman clerk in Oakland County's 176-year history.

In August 2006, Johnson was selected by Grand Rapids businessman and Republican gubernatorial nominee Dick DeVos as his running mate, becoming the GOP nominee for Lieutenant Governor of Michigan. DeVos and Johnson lost the general election to the incumbent Democratic ticket of Gov. Jennifer Granholm and Lt. Gov. John Cherry. In 2007, Johnson endorsed Sen. John McCain's bid for the 2008 Republican presidential nomination and served as the Oakland County Chair for McCain's Michigan campaign. Johnson was re-elected County Clerk in 2008, defeating Democrat Sheila Smith.

Secretary of State
As secretary, Johnson promoted motorcycle safety initiatives, such as wearing high-visibility gear and encouraging riders to get a cycle endorsement. Johnson herself is a licensed motorcycle rider and often rides in to motorcycle-related news conferences. Johnson pushed her departments to foster safe driving among teens. After reviewing the department's teen driver licensing program, National Highway Traffic Safety Administration offered recommendations for improvement but overall gave the program high praise for combating the leading cause of death for teens in the United States.

In 2014, Michigan was named the best state in the nation for registering qualified U.S. citizens at state motor-vehicle offices, according to USA Today. Also in 2014, the University of Michigan's Center for Local, State and Urban Policy found that the Secretary of State's Office was rated the second best state agency for job performance by community leaders. That same year, the state's Mackinac Bridge license plate was named the best designed plate in the world.

In July 2017, Ruth Johnson agreed to provide Michigan voter registration information to a federal commission created by Trump to investigate alleged illegal voting in the 2016 election. Johnson indicated she would only provide basic public voter information.

2010 Secretary of State election

In 2010, she won the Republican nomination for secretary of state at the party's state convention. Her opponents were Paul Scott, Michelle McManus, Anne Norlander and Cameron Brown.  She went on to win the general election defeating Democrat Jocelyn Benson, Libertarian Scotty Boman, Green John Anthony La Pietra, and US Taxpayer Robert Gale.

2014 Secretary of State election

In 2014, Johnson defeated Detroit lawyer and Democrat Godfrey Dillard, Libertarian James Lewis, US Taxpayers Robert Gale, and Natural Law Jason Gatties to earn a second term by 10.6 percentage points, receiving 1,649,047 votes to the defeated candidates 1,431,748 votes. She drew more votes than any other Republican candidate on the ballot.

2018 and 2022 Michigan State Senate elections 
After her tenure as Secretary of State, she was elected as a Michigan State Senator in 2018 and re-elected again in 2022. In September 2020, Johnson filed a lawsuit against Secretary of State Jocelyn Benson for allowing votes postmarked before election day to be counted after election day. The lawsuit was later dismissed.

Electoral history

References

External links 
Official Secretary of State bio of Johnson
Ruth Johnson for State Senate Website
Ruth Johnson for Senate Facebook page

Living people
20th-century American politicians
20th-century American women politicians
21st-century American politicians
21st-century American women politicians
County commissioners in Michigan
Republican Party members of the Michigan House of Representatives
Republican Party Michigan state senators
Oakland Community College alumni
Oakland University alumni
People from Holly, Michigan
Secretaries of State of Michigan
Wayne State University alumni
Women state constitutional officers of Michigan
Women state legislators in Michigan
Year of birth missing (living people)